The following is a timeline of the history of the city of Tuscaloosa, Alabama, United States.

19th century

 1809 - Creek people establish village on Black Warrior River.
 1813 - Village sacked by U.S. forces under John Coffee during the Creek War.
 1816 - Site settled by Thomas York.
 1818 - Settlement designated seat of newly formed Tuscaloosa County, Alabama Territory.
 1819
 City of Tuscaloosa incorporated.
 Tuscaloosa becomes part of the new U.S. state of Alabama.
 1826 - Alabama state capital relocated to Tuscaloosa from Cahaba.
 1831 - University of Alabama opens.
 1835 - Battle–Friedman House built.
 1837 - Independent Monitor newspaper begins publication.
 1840 - Population: 1,949.
 1847 - State capital relocated from Tuscaloosa to Montgomery.
 1850 - Alabama Historical Society headquartered in Tuscaloosa.
 1865 - Tuscaloosa besieged by Union forces during the American Civil War.
 1900 - Population: 5,094.

20th century

 1910 - Tuscaloosa News begins publication.
 1913 - Belvedere Theatre in business.
 1920 - Population: 11,996.
 1930 - University's Center for Business and Economic Research established.
 1933 - Moundville Archaeological Park established near Tuscaloosa.
 1936 - WJRD radio begins broadcasting.
 1949 - Tuscaloosa Regional Airport begins operating.
 1950 - Population: 46,396.
 1956 - Dale Drive-In cinema in business.
 1963 - Racial integration of University of Alabama ordered by United States district court.
 1964 - June 9: Police crackdown on demonstrators during the Civil Rights Movement.  The incident became known as "Bloody Tuesday". 
 1966 - Tuscaloosa County Preservation Society formed.
 1971 - Lake Tuscaloosa created.
 1978 - Alabama State Data Center headquartered in Tuscaloosa.
 1980 - Population: 75,211.
 1988 - University's Paul W. Bryant Museum opens.
 1991 - Jemison–Van de Graaff Mansion (house museum) established.
 2000 - December 16: December 2000 Tuscaloosa tornado.

21st century

 2003 - Artur Davis becomes U.S. representative for Alabama's 7th congressional district.
 2005 - Walter Maddox becomes mayor.
 2010 - Population: 90,468.
 2011
 April 27: 2011 Tuscaloosa–Birmingham tornado occurs.
 Terri Sewell becomes U.S. representative for Alabama's 7th congressional district.

See also
 Tuscaloosa history
 List of mayors of Tuscaloosa, Alabama
 National Register of Historic Places listings in Tuscaloosa County, Alabama
 Timelines of other cities in Alabama: Birmingham, Huntsville, Mobile, Montgomery

References

Bibliography

 
 
 
 G. Ward Hubbs. Tuscaloosa: Portrait of an Alabama County (Northridge, California: Windsor, 1987)
 Heritage of Tuscaloosa County, Alabama. Clanton, Ala.: Heritage Publishing Consultants, 1999.

External links

 
 
 Items related to Tuscaloosa, various dates (via Digital Public Library of America)

Tuscaloosa, Alabama
tuscaloosa
Tuscaloosa
Years in Alabama